Ahmed Noori, aka Abu Raihan Ahmed Noori, was a prominent writer and journalist who belonged to the Beary community of Mangalore in Dakshina Kannada in South India.

He was born on 10 June 1920 and grew up in Mangalore but later on lived in Bangalore. He completed the Adeeb-e-Mahir in Urdu from the Jamia Urdu Aligarh. He wrote books in the local Beary bashe and Kannada languages. His book, Maikala, a documentary about the culture Beary community of Mangalore in Kannada language, has been cataloged by the largest library in the world, the Library of Congress at Washington, D.C., USA. The second edition of the book was published in 1997, thirty seven years after the first edition published in 1960. He was also part of a six-member team of scholars who, for the first time, translated the meaning of the Quran to Kannada language in 1978, working on this project for about seven years. He edited several periodicals such as "Sandesha", "Kitaab" and "The Message". He contributed extensively to the Sanmarga weekly Kannada magazine. He was also one of the founding members of the Beary's Welfare Association in 1988. In 2010, the Karnataka Beary Sahitya Academy awarded him an honorary award for the year 2009 for his literary achievements. The Rajyotsava Prashasti eluded him though many community members thought that he deserved it for his services.

Over the past 50 years, he has become a household name in the Beary community due to his popular songs and music composition. Some of his popular songs are ‘Kelanda Makkale Kelanda,’ ‘Ethare Tholo Varakro Masth,’ ‘Alam Padachadum Neenem, Adre Chameychedum Neeneme.’ In January 2011, a CD of Beary Bashe songs written by him was released in Bangalore.

Ahmed Noorie died on 2 September 2012. Tributes poured from all around the region in the news media in multiple languages.

Photo
https://web.archive.org/web/20111008140909/http://mmujahid.webs.com/noori4.jpg

Bibliography

Books
1997 (first version 1960). Maikala* .

Periodicals
Sandesha
Kitaab
The Message

See also
 List of translations of the Qur'an

References

Indian Muslims
Indian male journalists
Living people
Mangaloreans
People from Dakshina Kannada district
Journalists from Karnataka
Year of birth missing (living people)